The Chicago Cobras, are a former USL W-League team based in Chicago, Illinois. The Cobras left the league after the completion of the 2004 season.

Players

Year-by-year

Honors
 USL W-League Midwest Division Champions 2004
 USL W-League Midwest Division Champions 2003

External links
Chicago Cobras

Women's soccer clubs in the United States
Soccer clubs in Chicago
Soccer clubs in Illinois
Defunct USL W-League (1995–2015) teams
Women's soccer clubs in Chicago